The Hague Convention on Hospital Ships is a 1904 multilateral treaty that supplemented the 1899 Hague Convention for the adaptation to Maritime Warfare of the Principles of the Geneva Convention. The convention established that during times of war, hospital ships would be exempted from dues and taxes imposed on vessels in the ports of the states that ratify the treaty. It is the one treaty on the laws of war that was concluded between the two conferences at The Hague in 1899 and 1907.

Entry into force and parties
The Hague Convention on Hospital Ships was concluded on 21 December 1904 and entered into force on 26 March 1907. It was signed by 26 states and as of 2014 it is in force for 30 states. One state—Serbia—signed the treaty but has not ratified it. The convention remains in force for the states that ratified it.

Notes

External links
"Convention on Hospital Ships", icrc.org.
Ratifications.

Hospital ships
1904 in the Netherlands
Treaties concluded in 1904
Treaties entered into force in 1907
Tax treaties
International humanitarian law treaties
Treaties of Austria-Hungary
Treaties of Belgium
Treaties of the Qing dynasty
Treaties of the Free City of Danzig
Treaties of Denmark
Treaties of the French Third Republic
Treaties of the German Empire
Treaties of the Kingdom of Greece
Treaties of Guatemala
Treaties of the Qajar dynasty
Treaties of the Kingdom of Italy (1861–1946)
Treaties of the Empire of Japan
Treaties of the Korean Empire
Treaties of Luxembourg
Treaties of Mexico
Treaties of the Principality of Montenegro
Treaties of the Netherlands
Treaties of Norway
Treaties of Peru
Treaties of the Second Polish Republic
Treaties of the Kingdom of Portugal
Treaties of the Kingdom of Romania
Treaties of the Russian Empire
Treaties of the Kingdom of Serbia
Treaties of Spain under the Restoration
Treaties of Sweden
Treaties of Switzerland
Treaties of Thailand
Treaties of Turkey
Treaties of the United States
Treaties extended to Curaçao and Dependencies
December 1904 events